High School Musical: Get in the Picture is a reality-based TV series, which debuted July 20, 2008 on the television channel ABC.  Stan Carrizosa was named the winner on September 8, 2008. Tierney Chamberlain was the runner-up.

The series is a spin-off of the popular Disney High School Musical franchise. Nick Lachey is the series host. The Faculty were Jen Malenke, Regina Williams, Tiana Brown, Rob Adler, Chris Prinzo, and Montre Burton.  Guest appearances and finale judging by Kenny Ortega. The show conducted a nationwide talent hunt followed by a group of contestants undergoing training to hone their skills.

Grand Prize
A record contract with Disney, and a music video to an original song, "Just Gettin' Started" to be shown during the credits of High School Musical 3: Senior Year. The contestants who did not advance were forced to go into the Chorus. However, the Chorus stayed on the show and were allowed to be backup singers/dancers in the music video.

Taping locations
Get in the Picture was taped at Murray High School in Murray, Utah. Murray High School was the venue used for the auditorium scene of High School Musical, as well as other films Read It and Weep, Take Down, and Minutemen. It is also the high school of American Idol runner-up David Archuleta. Taping also took place at a Kmart store in Draper, Utah. The finale was taped at the Pasadena Civic Auditorium in Pasadena, California.

Ratings
While the franchise may have had a built-in audience, the Nielsen ratings were surprisingly low, and the show was considered a major disappointment for the summer 2008 season by the entertainment media.  Besides being topped by reruns of sitcoms on CBS and Deal or No Deal encores along with the 2008 Summer Olympics on NBC, and many weeks by various repeats from Fox, the series was also constantly outrated in the 18-49 demo by the Spanish language telenovela Al Diablo con los Guapos on Univision; the telenovela beat HSM: Get in the Picture on five consecutive Mondays (August 11 through September 8) in the overall ratings those weeks.

Additionally in August, in markets where a pre-season edition of NFL Monday Night Football on ESPN aired over a broadcast station, the show was either pre-empted or delayed until a later time or date on the local ABC affiliate (which is usually the default station which takes ESPN simulcasts). The finale also suffered the same fate on September 8 within the Twin Cities of Minnesota, Green Bay & Milwaukee markets for the early portion of the Monday Night Football regular season premiere doubleheader.

Top 12 Contestants 

*Tony, John, Jessalyn, Ciara, Sean, Britney, Madison and Lauren were eliminated in the semi-finals, so no further information on them was released, including their last names and their hometown. Also, since they were eliminated in the semi-finals, unlike the other eliminated contestants, were not sent to the chorus, instead just sent home.

Performances 

Eastern Finals

Eliminated : Ciara, Jessalyn, John, and Tony

Western Finals

Eliminated : Sean, Britney, Madison, and Lauren

Top 12

Send to the chorus : Christie and Briana
Best Performer : Tierney

Top 10

Send to chorus : Anthony and Ether
Best Performer: Isaiah

Top 8

Send to chorus : Shayna and Bailey
Best Performer: Tierney

Top 6

Send to chorus : TJ
Best Performer: Christina

Top 5

Send to chorus : James
Best Performer: Isaiah

Top 4

Send to chorus : Christina
Best Performer: not announced (but Stan's name was read first)
 
Top 3

Send to chorus : Isaiah Best Performer: not announced (but Tierney's name was read first)Top 2Send to chorus : Tierney
Best Performer: Stan (WINNER!)

Voted Most Growth during competition by contestants: Anthony (Won a Special Finale Performance)

See also
High School Musical
High School Musical 2
High School Musical 3: Senior Year
High School Musical: El Desafío (disambiguation)

References

External links
High School Musical: Get in the Picture Official Site
 

American Broadcasting Company original programming
Get in the Picture
2008 American television series debuts
2008 American television series endings
Singing talent shows
2000s American high school television series
2000s American music television series
2000s American reality television series
American television spin-offs
Reality television spin-offs
Television series about teenagers
Television shows set in Utah
Television series by Disney–ABC Domestic Television